St. Louis to Liverpool is the seventh and tenth overall studio album by American musician Chuck Berry. Released in 1964 by Chess Records. It peaked at number 124 on the US Billboard album chart, the first of Berry's studio albums to appear on the chart. Music critic Dave Marsh called St. Louis to Liverpool "one of the greatest rock & roll records ever made".

Background
On October 18, 1963, Berry was released from prison after having spent 20 months incarcerated owing to conviction on a charge under the Mann Act. During his time in prison, emerging rock groups had found inspiration in his work. The Beach Boys had based their number 3 hit single "Surfin' U.S.A." on his "Sweet Little Sixteen"; the Beatles had included "Roll Over Beethoven" on their second American album; the debut single in the United Kingdom by the Rolling Stones was their cover of "Come On", and they had included "Carol" on their first American album, England's Newest Hitmakers.

Wishing to capitalize on his popularity during the British Invasion, Berry and Chess Records fashioned this album to appeal to young buyers. St. Louis to Liverpool includes four of the five charting singles he enjoyed in 1964, the final year he would have multiple records appearing on the Billboard Hot 100: "No Particular Place to Go", "You Never Can Tell", "Promised Land", and "Little Marie", a sequel to "Memphis, Tennessee". The additional eight tracks included the four B-sides of those singles; "Our Little Rendezvous", a b-side from 1960; a previously unreleased alternate take of his 1958 Christmas single "Merry Christmas Baby"; an instrumental outtake from a 1950s session; and "Liverpool Drive", a recent instrumental.

On April 13, 2004, the Chronicles division of the Universal Music Group remastered the album for CD with three bonus tracks as part of its 50th anniversary commemorative of Chess Records, including "O'Rangutang", the flip side of the fifth of his 1964 charting singles "Nadine (Is It You?)", and a track that had appeared on the 1990 rarities album Missing Berries. In 2008, Mobile Fidelity Sound Lab reissued the album with Chuck Berry Is on Top on an Ultradisc II Gold compact disc.

Track listing
All songs written by Chuck Berry except as noted.
Side one

Side two

2004 reissue bonus tracks

Personnel
 Chuck Berry – vocals, guitars
 Matt "Guitar" Murphy – electric guitar (track 2)
 Johnnie Johnson – piano (tracks 2, 6, 8, 11, 13–15)
 Lafayette Leake – piano (tracks 5, 10, 12)
 Paul Williams – piano (tracks 3–4, 9)
 Willie Dixon – bass (tracks 2, 5, 10–12)
 Odie Payne – drums (all tracks except 2, 10–11)
 Fred Below – drums (tracks 10–11)
 Ebby Hardy or Jaspar Thomas – drums (track 2)
 Leroy C. Davis – tenor saxophone (tracks 2, 6, 13–14)
 James Robinson – tenor saxophone (tracks 6, 13–14)
 Louis Satterfield - bass (track 3 and some others)

Technical
 Andy McKaie – reissue producer
 Vartan – reissue art direction
 Mike Fink – reissue design

Charts

Album

Single

References

External links

Chuck Berry albums
1964 albums
Albums produced by Phil Chess
Albums produced by Leonard Chess
Chess Records albums